The Peoples Press  was a weekly newspaper in Port Arthur, Texas, published from 1932 until 1941.  Its circulation was reported as 1,500 for 1933-39 and 2,500 for 1940–41. The editor was Carl White, who was previously the editor of Peoples Press in Port Neches from 1925 until 1931.

References 

Weekly newspapers published in Texas
Defunct newspapers published in Texas